The Afon Marlais is a right-bank tributary of the River Tâf in Pembrokeshire, West Wales. It flows through the Vale of Lampeter to join the Tâf just west of Whitland. The name derives from the Welsh 'marw glais' and signifies a 'stagnant stream'.

Course
In its first kilometre, the Marlais, flowing in a roughly easterly direction, then southeasterly, is joined by an unnamed left bank tributary before running under the A478 at Pant-y-gorphwys, then another left bank tributary and two right bank tributaries before turning east, then northeast meandering along Lampeter Vale where it is joined by numerous further tributaries, to pass under the A40 again at Pont Fadog. For all of its length after Pant-y-gorphwys, the river marks the boundary between the communities of Lampeter Velfrey and Llanddewi Velfrey in Pembrokeshire.

Geology
In the catchment area limestones of Llandeilo age are common.
Gold grains have been found in the river, the angular nature of some suggesting a local source.

Bridges
Pant-y-Gorphwys and its bridge, and Pont Fadog, are Royal Commission recorded historic place names.

Buildings

References

Rivers of Pembrokeshire